Frayer is a surname. Notable people with the surname include:

Janis Mackey Frayer (born 1970), Canadian journalist
Jared Frayer (born 1978), American wrestler
Kevin Frayer (born 1973), Canadian photojournalist
Lee Frayer (1874–1938), American racing driver